Amanita volvarielloides is a deadly mushroom classified by B. J. Rees.

The mushroom exists in Australia.

See also
 List of Amanita species

References

volvarielloides